The Bumthangpa or Bumthang people are an ethnic group of central Bhutan primarily living in the four main valleys, namely Ura, Chumey, Tang and Choekhor in Bumthang district. They speak the Bumthangkha or Bumthang language, a member of the extended Tibetan language family. It is mutually  intelligible with the Kheng language to the south and also to some extent with the Kurtöp language to the north. Linguist van Driem postulated that Khengkha, Bumthangkha, and Kurtöpkha are dialects of what he calls "a single Greater Bumthang" language.

Bumthangpa are ethnolinguistically same as the Kheng people and Kurtöp people of central Bhutan.
They are devoted followers of Tibetan Buddhism and the Nyingma tradition is widely practised across the region. A renowned 14th century Buddhist saint, Pema Lingpa, was born in Bumthang. Similarly, there are a number of secular and religious noble families, of which the Dung family is the oldest.

See also
Ethnic groups in Bhutan
 Bumthang language
Kheng language

References 

Ethnic groups in Bhutan